Chryssie Whitehead is an American actress, singer and dancer on Broadway, film and television as well as a passionate educator, director and choreographer.

Early life and education
Whitehead grew up in South Carolina. During her first year of high school, she was in a community theatre production of A Chorus Line, in which she played a cut dancer and understudy to Judy.

Career

Off Broadway
Before appearing on Broadway, Whitehead was a Rockette in Los Angeles and New York City at the start of her career right out of high school. She toured and performed in Fosse, The Will Rogers Follies, All Shook Up and Paul McCartney's "Driving Rain" tour.

On Broadway
Her Broadway debut was starring in the 2006 Broadway revival of A Chorus Line, in which she played the character of Kristine alongside Tony Yazbeck. The audition process that she took to get the role can be seen in Every Little Step, a documentary of the A Chorus Line Broadway revival casting process. Following Broadway, television roles ensued, as well as the musicals Damn Yankees as Lola, Gigi, Cats, A Chorus Line (as Cassie) and Will Rogers Follies as Z's Favorite. In 2011, she appeared in the role of Kathy opposite Neil Patrick Harris as Bobby in the New York Philharmonic production of Company. In 2016– 2017, she played the role of Kitty in the Broadway revival of Chicago, where she understudied and performed the role of Velma Kelly.

In film and television
Whitehead was Julia Stiles' dance double in the final audition scene of Save the Last Dance. She has also been in The Producers and other independent films. She was also in the ABC Family TV movie Revenge of the Bridesmaids with Raven Simone.

On television, Whitehead appeared as Helen Boyd in a 2007 episode of Grey's Anatomy, "Kung Fu Fighting", as well as in the TV series In Plain Sight in the episode "Coma Chameleon", playing the character of Krista. In 2011, she appeared on the TV series Castle, The Mentalist and Happy Endings. In 2012, she appeared on Switched at Birth. In 2013, she had a recurring role on four episodes of Private Practice. In 2014, Whitehead was a recurring guest star for three of the six final episodes of Warehouse 13. She played Claire Donovan, the older sister and eldest sibling to Claudia and Joshua Donovan. Her last television appearance was during the third season of Grimm in 2014. Her last film credit was in the remake of West Side Story film directed by Steven Spielberg as the female social worker at the dance at the gym.

Other aspects
In addition to performing, Chryssie is a director, choreographer and writer. She produced her autobiographical show, In My Own Little Corner: A Work in Progress with Bipolar Disorder as a fundraiser in New York City, November 5th, 2022. The goal is to travel with the show to spread mental health care and awareness, stopping the stigma and normalizing the conversation around mental illness. 

She is the proud co-founder/director of the performing arts educational company with an holistic approach, Broadway Arts Community (BAC) with best friend of 20+ years,  Alexis Carra. BAC coaches privately and provides workshops in acting for camera, musical theatre, college and career prep. 

Chryssie is a proud faculty member who teaches theatre jazz and jazz dance at Broadway Dance Center and Steps on Broadway in New York.

Personal life
Whitehead resides in New York City with her husband and two dogs. She is a director and musical theatre faculty member at the American Musical and Dramatic Academy on the New York campus.

References

External links

Official website Chryssie Whitehead
 Dance Act Sing Intensive with Chryssie Whitehead
 Broadway Arts Camp

American female dancers
Dancers from South Carolina
American musical theatre actresses
American film actresses
American television actresses
Living people
Year of birth missing (living people)
Actresses from South Carolina
21st-century American women